U of L is an abbreviation that can refer to the following universities:

Austria
 University of Leoben
 University of Linz

Canada
 University of Lethbridge in Lethbridge, Alberta

Ireland
 University of Limerick in Castletroy, Limerick

Latvia
 University of Latvia

Portugal
 University of Lisbon

South Africa
 University of Limpopo

United Kingdom
 University of Leeds
 University of Leicester
 University of Lincoln
 University of Liverpool
 University of London

United States
 University of Louisville